Two Riders on the Beach is the title of two similar paintings by Max Liebermann. Both were painted in 1901 while Liebermann was on vacation in Scheveningen on the North Sea. The paintings are considered masterpieces of German impressionism, heavily influenced by the style of French impressionist painters Édouard Manet and Edgar Degas.

One of the paintings in the 1930s belonged to the collection of Jewish factory owner and art collector David Friedmann in Wrocław, then Breslau, Silesia. It was seized by the Nazi authorities shortly after the anti-Jewish Kristallnacht pogrom in 1938 and in 1942, one of Hitler's official art dealers, Hildebrand Gurlitt, acquired Two Riders on the Beach from "Aryan" auctionneer Hans W. Lange. 

After World War II the painting was seized by Allied Monuments Men along with other works from Gurlitt's collection, and Gurlitt was investigated for his role in Nazi art looting by the Art Looting Investigation Unit.

"Amazingly," Susan Ronald wrote in Hitler's Art Thief: Hildebrand Gurlitt, the Nazis, and the Looting of Europe's Treasures,

In 2012, in an event that made headlines around the world, Hildebrand Gurlitt' son, Cornelius Gurlitt, was discovered to have a secret stash of paintings. The 2012 Munich artworks discovery led to the rediscovery of Two Riders on the Beach. The surviving family of David Friedman recognized the looted painting and demanded its return, which took place in 2015. "David Toren remembers staring at Max Liebermann’s Two Riders on a Beach as his great-uncle signed over his estate to a Nazi general. Now his family has it back."

The painting was sold at Sotheby's in June 2015.

The other painting was part of a private collection in New York City before it was sold at Sotheby's in 2009. The new owner was again a private collector. The paintings are very similar; one difference is that the one that was part of Friedmann's collection shows both forelegs of the second horse.

See also
 List of claims for restitution for Nazi-looted art
 The Holocaust
 Hildebrand Gurlitt
 Kindertransport

References

External links
 
 
 Case Review: David Toren v. Federal Republic of Germany and Free State of Bavaria – Task Force Confirms Origin of Liebermann Painting

1901 paintings
Paintings by Max Liebermann
Impressionist paintings
Horses in art
Water in art
Nazi-looted art